WDMA may refer to:

 WDMA (computer), transfer mode between a harddisk and computer
 Wavelength division multiple access, used in optical communication links
 WDMA-CD, a television station (channel 16, virtual channel 31) licensed to Macon, Georgia, United States